Minimalism was an art movement that began during the 1960s. This list of minimalist artists are primarily artists whose works were done in the 1960s, and are considered minimal, although some artists subsequently radically changed their work in the 1970s and in subsequent decades. This list is incomplete.

Artists to whom the term minimalist was originally applied 

 Carl Andre (born 1935), American sculptor 
 Jo Baer (born 1929), American artist, associated with minimalist art 
 Larry Bell (born 1939), American sculptor
 Ronald Bladen (1918–1988), American sculptor 
 Dan Flavin (1933–1996), American installation artist, fluorescent light sculpture 
 Donald Judd (1928–1994), American sculptor 
 Sol LeWitt (1928–2007), American installation artist
 Robert Mangold (born 1937), American painter
 Agnes Martin (1912–2004), Canadian/American painter
 John McCracken (1934–2011), American sculptor 
 Robert Morris (1931-2018), American sculptor
 Robert Ryman (1930-2019), American painter
 Fred Sandback (1943–2003), American installation artist 
 Tony Smith (1912–1980), pioneer of minimalist sculpture 
 Frank Stella (born 1936), American painter/sculptor

Other artists whose work might be regarded as related to minimalist art 
 Anne Truitt (1921–2004), American sculptor
 Frederick Spratt (1927–2008), American painter/sculptor
 Anthony Caro (1924–2013), British sculptor
 Ellsworth Kelly (1923–2015), American painter/sculptor 
 Richard Serra (born 1939), American sculptor
 Bob Law (1934–2004), British painter/sculptor
 James Lee Byars (1932–1997), American sculptor/performance artist

Other artists whose work might be regarded as proto-minimalist 
 Geraldo de Barros (1923-1998),painter and photographer,was known for his trailblazing work in experimental abstract photography and modernism
 Piet Mondrian (1872–1944), Dutch painter
 Kasimir Malevich (1878–1935), Russian painter, pioneer of abstract art
 Josef Albers (1888–1976), German-American painter
 Giorgio Morandi (1890–1964), Italian Still-life painter, proto-Minimalist 
 Barnett Newman (1905–1970), American painter, abstract expressionist 
 David Smith (1906–1965), pioneer of geometric and minimalist sculpture
 Ad Reinhardt (1913–1967), American painter, abstract expressionist

Musical artists whose work might be regarded as minimalist

 John Adams (born 1947)
 Roberto Carnevale (born 1966)
 John Cage (1912–1992)
 Kyle Bobby Dunn (born 1986) 
 Morton Feldman (1926–1987) 
 Jon Gibson (1940–2020)
 Philip Glass (born 1937)
 Tom Johnson (born 1939)
 Alvin Lucier (1931-2021) 
 Charlemagne Palestine (born 1947)
 Steve Reich (born 1936)
 Terry Riley (born 1935)
 Erik Satie (1866–1925)
 Howard Skempton (born 1947)
 Simeon ten Holt (1923–2012)
 Yann Tiersen (born 1970) 
 La Monte Young (born 1935)

See also
 Neo-minimalism
 Minimalism (visual arts)

Minimalist artists